Fred Calvin Maples (1910 – February 28, 1987) was an American Southern gospel singer and Baptist minister. He was the founder of the Harmoneers Quartet in the 1940s. He later served as the minister of music and education at Pinecrest Baptist Church in Lilburn, Georgia. He was inducted into the Southern Gospel Museum and Hall of Fame posthumously in 2003.

References

1910 births
1987 deaths
People from Lilburn, Georgia
Southern Baptist ministers
Southern gospel performers
20th-century Baptist ministers from the United States